Saint Antiochus of Sulcis (died c. 127 AD) was an early Christian martyr of Sardinia.  The island and town of Sant'Antioco are named after him.

History and legend
Antiochus is a figure associated with the Sardinian mines from which the Romans extracted minerals and precious metals; the Romans condemned prisoners of war and Christians to work these mines.  

Antiochus' legend states that he was condemned to work the mines on the island that now bears his name.  The island, inhospitable and isolated during this period, was named Plumbaria at the time, after its source of lead (plumbum).  His legend also states that he was a physician during the reign of Hadrian.  He had converted many people in Cappadocia and Galatia to the Christian religion, and was therefore tortured and sent into exile by the authorities.  Antiochus, however, converted his jailer Cyriacus in Sardinia, and had built a small underground oratory on Plumbaria, and was thus condemned to death there.

Veneration
Some sources state that he was martyred with Cyriacus at Sebaste rather than at Sardinia.

Notes

Bibliography

External links
 Sant’Antioco

People from Sardinia
127 deaths
2nd-century Christian martyrs
Year of birth unknown